Solinki  is a village in the administrative district of Gmina Konstantynów, within Biała Podlaska County, Lublin Voivodeship, in eastern Poland.

The village has an approximate population of 100.

References

Villages in Biała Podlaska County